Fontaine-les-Coteaux is a commune in the Loir-et-Cher department of central France.

Population

Sights
Arboretum de la Fosse

See also
Communes of the Loir-et-Cher department

References

Communes of Loir-et-Cher